David Nathan (9 December 1926 – 21 April 2001) was a British journalist.

Born in Manchester, he joined the Daily Herald in 1955. Initially employed as a general reporter, he became a drama critic and entertainment writer on the newspaper. From 1962 he was a contributor to satirical comedy programmes broadcast by BBC television, including That Was The Week That Was on which he collaborated with Dennis Potter during 1963.

By the 1970s he was a drama critic on The Jewish Chronicle and became the weeklies deputy editor in 1985 remaining in the post until 2001.

Nathan co-wrote the first biography of Tony Hancock with the comedian's second wife Freddie, the first edition was published in 1969, and books about of the actors John Hurt and Glenda Jackson

References

External links

1926 births
2001 deaths
British male journalists
British theatre critics
Presidents of the Critics' Circle